Shasha or Sha Sha may refer to:

Places
 Shasha Forest Reserve, Nigeria
 Shasheh or Shasha (Persian:  ششه), a village in Iran

People
 Sha Sha (singer) (born 1994), Zimbabwean singer
 Shasha Nakhai, Canadian film director
 Mark Shasha (born 1961), U.S. artist
 Dennis Shasha, U.S. professor
 Yifat Shasha-Biton (born 1973), Israeli politician
 Chung Hsin-yu (born 1983; also known as Sha Sha), Taiwanese host

Other
 Sha Sha (album), a 2002 album by Ben Kweller
 Shasha dialect, a dialect of Nkoya language of Zambia
 Sha-Sha, part of Telly Inc. Arabic film streaming service
 "Sha-Sha", a 1938 song written by Jimmy Van Heusen
 a minor hit for the Andrew Sisters

See also
 Sha (disambiguation)
 Sasha (disambiguation)